Zanganeh is a village in Howmeh Rural District, in the Central District of Lamerd County, Fars Province, Iran. At the 2006 census, its population was 70, in 15 families.

References 

Populated places in Lamerd County